Park Cities Presbyterian Church (PCPC) is a Presbyterian Church in America megachurch in Dallas, Texas with about 5,500 members.

It is member of the North Texas Presbytery of the PCA.

History 
PCPC's origins started out of a failed attempt by Highland Park Presbyterian Church to withdraw from the Presbyterian Church (U.S.A.) (although a simple majority(2,563) voted to withdraw and 2,001 to remain in the PC(USA), the vote required a 2/3 majority and thus the motion failed).

At that time Highland Park was the second numerous Presbyterian Congregation in the US with more than 7,000 members. It was a bastion of conservative theology within the PC(USA).

A group of individuals thus decided to leave HPPC and form a Presbyterian congregation not affiliated with PC(USA).  The first worship service was held on May 29, 1991 at the auditorium of Highland Park High School. The attendance was about 1,500-2,000, they followed elder Harry Hargrave and other dissenting leaders in the next Sunday after the vote. In June 1991 PCPC started meeting in the facilities of Highland Baptist Church; PCPC would ultimately purchase the building. On June 23, 1991 the congregation adopted its current name. The Highland Park Church lost more than a quarter of its membership, resulting decreased tithing, budgetary belt-tightening and downsizing at the church complex on University Boulevard. Many who left Highland Park were elders and deacons and the majority of Sunday school teachers. Morale among who stayed underwent its own slump.

First senior pastor of Park Cities congregation was Rev. Skip Ryan who served until 2006. During Pastor Ryan's 15 years of ministry, the church had grown from 1,500 members to 5,000-5,500, and helped planting 57 churches in Dallas and the world. On May 11, 2008 Rev. Mark Alan Davis was installed as senior pastor.

Doctrine 
The church theologically describes itself as evangelical, evangelistic, Reformed, confessional, covenantal, Presbyterian and Kingdom centered.
The Westminster Confession of Faith is the official standard.

Missions 
Park Cities Presbyterian Church is involved in several home mission efforts including the Southwest church Planting Network of the PCA which facilitates new PCA churches be planted in Texas, Oklahoma, New Mexico and Arizona. There are outreach and Presbyterian church planting works in Laos (Lao Presbyterian Fellowship), Senegal, Japan, South India, Peru mission, Kiev mission.

References

External links 
 Church website
 Facebook
 Twitter

Presbyterian Church in America churches in Texas
Churches in Dallas
Presbyterian megachurches in the United States
Megachurches in Texas
Evangelical churches in Texas
Christian organizations established in 1991
1991 establishments in Texas